Lee Hill may refer to:

 Lee Hill (writer), American biographer
 Lee Hill (actor) (1894–1957), silent film actor
 Lee Hill (baseball) (1895–?), American Negro leagues baseball player
 Lee Hill (cinematographer) (1907–1952), New Zealand cinematographer
 Lee Hill (Scientist), South African Exercise Scientist